The MBTA Commuter Rail  system serves as the commuter rail arm of the Massachusetts Bay Transportation Authority's (MBTA's) transportation coverage of Greater Boston in the United States. It is operated under contract by Keolis, which took over operations on July 1, 2014, from the Massachusetts Bay Commuter Railroad Company (MBCR).

The line's characteristic purple-trimmed coaches operate as far south as North Kingstown, Rhode Island, and as far north as Newburyport and as far west as Fitchburg, both in Massachusetts.

Trains originate at two major terminals in Boston – South Station and North Station. The only connection between the two halves of the system is the non-revenue Grand Junction Branch. The North–South Rail Link is a proposed tunnel between North Station and South Station to allow through-running service.

Service

Lines
The system consists of twelve lines – four of which have branches – radiating from downtown Boston. Eight "southside" lines terminate at South Station, with four (Framingham/Worcester, Needham, Franklin/Foxboro, and Providence/Stoughton) also running through Back Bay station. Four "northside" lines terminate at North Station. The Kingston Line and Middleborough/Lakeville Line are often grouped together as the Old Colony Lines. The lines vary in length from the  Fairmount Line to the  Providence/Stoughton Line, with typical lengths in the  range. The system has  of revenue trackage and covers roughly the eastern third of Massachusetts plus central Rhode Island.

Most lines do not share trackage outside the Boston terminal areas, with several exceptions. The Haverhill Line and Newburyport/Rockport Line share tracks between North Station and near . A small number of Haverhill Line trains use the inner Lowell Line and the Wildcat Branch, while a small number of Franklin/Foxboro Line trains use the Fairmount Line rather than the Northeast Corridor. Private companies also operate freight service over much of the system (see ).

Stations

, there are 134 active stations – 53 northside and 81 southside. Six additional stations (and ) are indefinitely closed due to service cuts during the COVID-19 pandemic. Three stations (and ) are temporarily closed due to structural deterioration. six additional stations are under construction as part of the South Coast Rail project; several other stations are planned. South Station, North Station, and Back Bay all have MBTA subway and Amtrak connections; nine other stations have subway connections, and six others have Amtrak connections.

Stations range in size from small platforms like  to the sprawling downtown terminals. Most stations outside downtown Boston have one or two side platforms or a single island platform. The MBTA uses -high platforms for accessible level boarding, as is standard in the northeastern United States. , the MBTA is designing a temporary accessible platform that can be added to stations pending full reconstructions.

Operations
The MBTA Commuter Rail system is operated by Keolis Commuter Services – a subsidiary of French company Keolis – under contract to the MBTA. The MBTA owns all passenger equipment and most stations. Most trackage is also owned by the MBTA. The Massachusetts Department of Transportation (parent agency of the MBTA) owns several portions of the Framingham/Worcester Line as well as the Grand Junction Branch, which is used for non-revenue equipment moves between the northside and southside lines.

Most lines operate on regular headways, though some have additional service at peak hours. Service levels vary by lines: the Greenbush and Kingston lines have 13 round trips on weekdays, while the Providence/Stoughton Line has 36. Running times vary from 30 minutes on the Fairmount Line to nearly 120 minutes for some Providence/Stoughton Line trips, with 60–75 minutes typical. Most trains stop at all stations on the line; some peak-hour express trains operate on the Framingham/Worcester and Providence/Stoughton lines. Several lines additionally have some short turn service. The CapeFlyer, a seasonal weekend-only service to Cape Cod, operates using MBTA equipment over the Middleborough/Lakeville Line plus the Cape Main Line (which is not otherwise used by the MBTA). Special express service to Foxboro station is operated during New England Patriots home games and some other events at Gillette Stadium. It runs from South Station via the Franklin Line, and from Providence via the Providence/Stoughton Line. During the winter, one "ski train" round trip of the Fitchburg Line operates with a bicycle car on weekends and Wednesday evenings, with a shuttle bus to Wachusett Mountain.

All MBTA commuter rail service is provided by push-pull trains powered by diesel locomotives (see ). The entire system is signalled and operates with Positive Train Control using the Advanced Civil Speed Enforcement System. The southside lines have cab signals for automatic train control; cab signals will be placed in service on the northside lines in 2023. The MBTA is a member of the Northeast Operating Rules Advisory Committee (NORAC) and uses its operating rules. Most portions of the system operate under NORAC rules 261 and 562, which allow bidirectional train movements on every track (such as an express train passing a local train in the same direction). Portions of the Fitchburg, Haverhill, and Newburyport/Rockport lines operate under NORAC rule 251, which allow trains to run only in a single direction on each track. Most lines are either double track, or single track with passing sidings; portions of the Northeast Corridor have three or four tracks.

Freight service 

Freight service is operated over most of the MBTA Commuter Rail system by several private railroads. CSX Transportation operates freight on most southside lines, of which the outer portion of the Worcester Line has the most freight traffic. Massachusetts Coastal Railroad operates south of Middleborough on the Middleborough/Lakeville Line, as well as on future South Coast Rail trackage. The Fore River Railroad operates between Braintree Yard and East Braintree on the Old Colony mainline and the Greenbush Line. The Providence and Worcester Railroad shares tracks with Providence/Stoughton Line trains between Providence and Wickford Junction; it uses a freight-only track between Providence and Central Falls. No freight operates on the Needham Line, the Northeast Corridor between Readville and Back Bay, the Old Colony mainline between Boston and the Greenbush Line junction in Braintree, the Plymouth/Kingston Line, and most of the Greenbush Line.

CSX also operates on most northside lines; prior to its 2022 purchase by CSX, Pan Am Railways operated over these lines. Pan Am Southern (planned to be replaced by the Berkshire and Eastern Railroad) operates over the Fitchburg Line west of Ayer. Their combined Freight Main Line between Mechanicville, New York, and Mattawamkeag, Maine, shares tracks with sections of the Fitchburg, Lowell, and Haverhill lines. No freight service is operated over the Newburyport/Rockport Line north of Salem.

Weight limits and loading gauge vary across the system. The inner Fitchburg and Newburyport/Rockport Lines, and the southside except for the outer Framingham/Worcester Line, have height restrictions smaller than Plate F.

Fares 

MBTA Commuter Rail uses a zone fare system, with fares increasing with distance. Ten additional zones, numbered 1 through 10, extend outwards from Boston. Each zone is about 5 miles, with most outer terminals in zones 6 through 8. Zone 1A fares are identical to MBTA subway fares (though subway passes on CharlieCards are not accepted, except for Fairmount Line stations that have CharlieCard validator machines). , one-way fares within Zone 1A are $2.40, while fares between further zones and Zone 1A range from $6.50 for Zone 1 to $13.25 for Zone 10.

Fares can be purchased on the MBTA mTicket app, at automatic vending machines located at major stations, from businesses near some stations, or from conductors on board trains. Discounted passes include monthly passes (with or without free transfer to other MBTA services), "flex passes" valid for five 24-hour periods, and $10 passes offering unlimited travel on a single weekend. As with other MBTA services, discounted fares and passes are available for several groups including disabled passengers, passengers over age 65, and students attending certain schools. Foxboro special event services and the CapeFlyer have separate fares; regular MBTA fares and passes are not valid. Fares are collected by train conductors; while fare evasion is explicitly illegal under state law, it is not criminal. Faregates have also been installed at North Station, with plans for installation at Back Bay and South Station. The second-generation MBTA fare collection system, planned for completion in 2024, will standardize fare media across modes and allow uses of CharlieCards for all commuter rail trips.

History

Early history

Eight intercity mainlines radiating from Boston opened between 1834 and 1855: the Boston and Worcester Railroad (B&W) in 1834–35, Boston and Providence Railroad (B&P) in 1834–35, Boston and Lowell Railroad (B&L) in 1835, Eastern Railroad in 1838–1840, Fitchburg Railroad in 1843–45, Boston and Maine Railroad (B&M) in 1845, Old Colony Railroad and Fall River Railroad in 1845–46, and Norfolk County Railroad in 1849–55. Commuter rail service allowing suburban residents to work in Boston began with the B&W in 1834; by the 1860s, commuting was possible on the eight mainlines and a number of branch lines. Mergers prior to the 1880s were primarily acquisitions of branch lines and consolidations with connecting lines: the B&A merged with the Western Railroad in 1874 to become the Boston and Albany Railroad (B&A), the Fall River Railroad and several other lines merged into the Old Colony Railroad, and the Norfolk County Railroad eventually became part of the New York and New England Railroad (NY&NE). The narrow gauge Boston, Revere Beach and Lynn Railroad (BRB&L) opened in 1875, competing with the inner portion of the Eastern Railroad. Unlike the other lines, it never built rails into downtown Boston, and instead relied on a ferry connection from East Boston.

The B&M obtained control of the Eastern in 1883, the B&L in 1887, and the Fitchburg in 1900, giving it a near-monopoly on rail service north of Boston. North Union Station was built in 1893 to provide a union station for northside service; it was replaced by North Station in 1928. The Old Colony obtained control of the B&P in 1888; the New York, New Haven and Hartford Railroad acquired the Old Colony in 1893 to obtain access to Boston. The New Haven also acquired the New England Railroad (successor to the NY&NE) in 1898. South Station opened in 1899 as a union station for the southside lines (New Haven and B&A). The New York Central and Hudson River Railroad – which later became the New York Central) (NYC) – leased the B&A in 1900; this brought all Boston commuter service save the BRB&L under the control of three large multi-state railroads.

The three railroads all planned electrification of some suburban lines in the early 20th century. The New Haven tested electrification on small parts of the Old Colony system, but never followed through on its plans to electrify South Station and the inner section of the ex-B&P. Despite a study to electrify the mainline to  plus the Highland branch, the NYC only electrified the short Lower Falls Branch. Quadruple-tracking and electrification of part of the ex-Eastern Railroad was planned by the B&M around 1910 when it was briefly under control of the New Haven, but this fell through when they separated. Service levels on the three major railroads peaked around 1910 and began to decline from streetcar and later auto competition in the 1910s. The independent BRB&L electrified its mainline and single branch line in 1928 and increased service to near-rapid transit levels. Two Old Colony branches were converted to an extension of Boston Elevated Railway (BERy) rapid transit in the 1920s.

Service levels declined more significantly during the 1930s; the 88 stations case resulted in the New Haven closing dozens of suburban stations and several lines in 1938. The BRB&L ceased all operations in 1940. Ridership increased during World War II but decreased soon afterwards, prompting further cuts. The railroads converted from steam to diesel in the 1950s. All three purchased substantial fleets of Budd Rail Diesel Cars, which lowered operating costs – but not enough to save most branch lines. A 1945–47 state report proposed suburban extensions of the rapid transit system, largely using railroad rights-of-way, with the expectation that most commuter rail service would be cut back to the rapid transit terminals or abandoned entirely. Prompted by the report, part of the BRB&L was reactivated as rapid transit in 1952–54 by BERy successor Metropolitan Transit Authority (MTA), and the Highland branch was converted to a rapid streetcar line in 1958–59.

Consolidation under MBTA control 
The three railroads all made major cuts to suburban service in 1958–1960 as commuters began using new expressways. The B&M became unprofitable in 1958 and moved to shed its money-losing passenger operations. Four branch lines were cut that May, and most stations in the MTA service area were closed; three more branches closed in 1959. The New Haven experimentally increased Old Colony Division service for several years in the 1950s, but new management soon sought to reduce costs. The inner portion of the B&A was reduced from four to two tracks in 1959 for construction of the Massachusetts Turnpike, with several inner stations closed; all local stops west of Framingham were closed in 1960. The New Haven filed for bankruptcy for the last time in 1961. Faced with the imminent threat of losing what service remained, public opinion began to support subsidies for commuter rail.

The state Mass Transportation Commission (MTC), formed in 1959 to coordinate transportation and land use, held a series of a experiments to determine how fares and service levels affected ridership. This included a trial on the MTA bus network, as well as a $4 million test from January 1963 to March 1964 on New Haven and B&M lines. (The NYC, uninterested in its commuter service, declined to participate.) The MTC found that higher frequency was most important to attract additional ridership; lower fares would attract additional riders, while even higher fares would not result in the services becoming profitable. At the recommendation of the MTC, the Massachusetts Bay Transportation Authority (MBTA) was created on August 3, 1964, with a 78-municipality funding and service district. The MBTA was to build rapid transit extensions (as planned in 1947) along some lines, with the others to be subsidized or allowed to be discontinued. Most remaining lines ran to points outside the funding district; those outlying municipalities were expected to reach their own subsidy agreements with the railroads.

On December 14, 1964, the MBTA reached a subsidy agreement with the B&M. The agreement only covered in-district services; on January 5, 1965, the B&M discontinued interstate service except for single commuter round trips from Dover and Concord, New Hampshire; Portsmouth service was cut back to a single  round trip. On June 30, 1967, the B&M discontinued the Concord trip; the Dover trip was cut back to Haverhill with local subsidies. In 1969, the B&M averaged 24,000 weekday passengers, with a yearly deficit of $3.2 million (equivalent to  million in ). The single daily trip on the Central Mass Branch ended on January 26, 1971.

On July 28, 1965, the MBTA signed an agreement with the New Haven Railroad to purchase  of the former Old Colony mainline from Fort Point Channel to South Braintree in order to construct a new rapid transit line along the corridor. The line was expected to be completed within two years. The agreement also provided for the MBTA to subsidize commuter service on the railroad's remaining commuter rail lines for $1.2 million (equivalent to  million in ) annually. Subsidies for the Needham, Millis, Dedham, and Franklin lines began on April 24, 1966, as the New Haven had Interstate Commerce Commission (ICC) permission to discontinue them otherwise. Three out-of-district stations were cut, while Franklin subsidized its station. The Millis and Dedham lines were discontinued on April 21, 1967. The NYC and the Pennsylvania Railroad merged to form Penn Central on February 1, 1968; the New Haven joined at the end of the year. Penn Central declared bankruptcy in 1970. Amtrak took over most intercity passenger service in the US on May 1, 1971, including New York–Boston trains.

The state agreed in December 1971 to purchase  of Penn Central rights of way to prevent them being sold off in bankruptcy. The MBTA purchased the lines effective January 27, 1973. They included almost all the lines with passenger service: the Attleboro Line and Stoughton Branch, Franklin Branch, Needham Branch, and the –Framingham portion of the Worcester Main Line. (The inner section of that line was already owned by the Massachusetts Turnpike Authority.) The purchase also included several freight-only or abandoned lines, including the Old Colony mainline between Braintree and Brockton. The MBTA purchased the B&M Western Route between Somerville and Wilmington Junction in September 1973 for construction of the Haymarket North Extension

From 1967 to 1973, a series of state appropriations covered 90–100% of outside-of-district subsidy. This was reduced to 50% in January 1974, substantially increasing the cost of these municipalities. Amtrak began running the Lake Shore Limited over that route four days later, restoring rail service to Worcester. State subsidies were increased back to 75% in June 1976 to prevent further cuts.

Combined operations 

Rapid transit extension was slower than expected; by 1971, the only extension in service was the first portion of the Red Line Braintree Branch on the Old Colony mainline. In 1972, as part of a funding shift from highways to transit, Governor Francis Sargent initiated a Commuter Rail Improvement Program. On October 8, 1974, the MBTA began using purple to represent the commuter rail system, as had been done in 1965 with the rapid transit lines. MBTA maps began showing the B&M and Penn Central lines as a single system. Penn Central became Conrail on April 1, 1976; the MBTA purchased most of their commuter rolling stock at that time. This included all lines with passenger service, as well as a number of freight-only or abandoned lines. This also marked the start of a five-year contract for the B&M to operate the service, replacing a series of one-year contracts. After acquiring the B&M and Penn Central rolling stock, the MBTA painted it with purple, yellow, silver, and black to create a visual identity.

Federal subsidies allowed MBTA subsidies to Penn Central to remain the same until March 1977, when a large increase was expected. Since it owned the tracks and equipment, the MBTA bid out the operating contract, which was won by the B&M.  The B&M began operating the southside lines on March 15, 1977; for the first time, all Boston commuter service was operated by one entity. Although all operation was subsidized by this time, a small number of cuts took place. The lightly-used Lexington Branch closed after a snowstorm on January 10, 1977. Woburn Branch service ended on January 30, 1981, amid state budget cuts.

However, the energy crises of the 1970s and the formation of regional transit authorities prompted some expansions and improvements. $70 million in reconstruction work (equivalent to  million in ) on the Franklin Line and several northside lines, partially funded by the Urban Mass Transportation Administration, began in 1977 under the Commuter Rail Improvement Program. Federally-funded experimental service to Nashua, Manchester, and Concord, New Hampshire ran from January 28, 1980, to March 1, 1981. The MBTA also began replacing the aging Rail Diesel Cars and other equipment; 18 EMD F40PH diesel locomotives and 60 passenger cars arrived between 1978 and 1980.

Several major disruptions occurred in the mid-1980s. On January 20, 1984, a fire destroyed the wooden approach trestles to the North Station drawbridges. The four northside lines used temporary terminals with rapid transit connections while the trestles were rebuilt. Another bridge fire between Beverly and Salem on November 16, 1984, isolated part of the Ipswich/Rockport Line from the rest of the system. Service to North Station resumed on April 20, 1985; service to Ipswich and Rockport resumed on December 1, 1985.

Guilford Transportation Industries purchased the B&M in 1983. This did not initially affect commuter rail operations. Guilford's attempts to regain profitability, which included reducing employee headcount and pay, soon soured labor relations. This resulted in two strikes by Guilford employees; the first shut down the commuter rail system from March 21 to May 12, 1986. Local media was critical of Guilford during the strike; the company did not bid for a renewal of the commuter rail operating contract, which expired at the end of 1986. Amtrak won the contract for commuter rail operations and took over the system on January 1, 1987. Gardner service was cut back to Fitchburg at that time due to a dispute between Amtrak, Guilford, and the MBTA.

Expansions 
The late 1980s saw the beginning of substantial expansion of the system. The Southwest Corridor project was completed in 1987 with a new below-ground alignment for commuter rail, Amtrak, and Orange Line trains. Back Bay and  stations were completely rebuilt as transfer stations, and  opened to serve the growing Longwood Medical Area. The Needham Line, closed since 1979 for construction, was reopened. The Attleboro and Franklin lines had been diverted over the previously freight-only Dorchester Branch during construction; after they returned to the Southwest Corridor, a shuttle service was retained as the Fairmount Line. Peak-hour service to Providence resumed in 1988 (with off-peak and weekend service later added);  was added in 1990 as a park-and-ride station to replace .

Massachusetts had state accessibility laws since 1977 – prior to 1990 federal legislation. At times, the MBTA clashed with state regulators: several stations including West Natick and Chelsea were built without accessible platforms despite state rules; the latter resulted in fines from the Massachusetts Architectural Access Board (MAAB). The opening of South Attleboro was delayed by the MAAB because of the MBTA's refusal to build full-length high-level platforms. However, the MBTA did slowly increase accessibility of the system. Most Ipswich/Rockport line stations were made accessible during the 1984–85 closure, and renovations followed at other stations. South Station was made accessible in the late 1980s, Back Bay during the Southwest Corridor project, and North Station in the early 1990s, providing accessibility at the main downtown Boston stations. By 1992, 44 commuter rail stations were accessible.

In 1991, the state agreed to build a set of transit projects as part of the settlement of a lawsuit by the Conservation Law Foundation (CLF) over auto emissions from the Central Artery/Tunnel Project (Big Dig). Among these project were extensions of the Framingham Line to Worcester and the Ipswich/Rockport Line to Newburyport, restoration of the Old Colony Lines, and addition of 20,000 park and ride spaces outside the urban core. Peak-hour service to Worcester began in 1994, followed by off-peak and weekend service; four intermediate stations were added in 2000 and 2002. Service on the Old Colony Lines (Middleborough/Lakeville Line and Kingston/Plymouth Line) began in 1997.  and  opened in 1998. The MBTA Commuter Rail Maintenance Facility, which replaced the ex-B&M Boston Engine Terminal, was completed in 1998.

Two tenders were submitted in 2003, one from GTI and another from the newly formed Massachusetts Bay Commuter Railroad Company (MBCR), a partnership between Connex (later Veolia), Bombardier Transportation and Alternate Concepts, Inc. MBCR won the contract, and took over the MBTA Commuter Rail operation from Amtrak in July 2003. The MBCR contract originally expired in July 2008 but had an additional five-year option; it was later extended three years to July 2011 and then another two to July 2013. After concerns about on-time performance, the 2011 extension increased the fine for late trains from $100 to $300.

The MBTA considered running the service directly rather than contracting it out, but this "public option" was rejected in 2012. In August 2012, MBCR and Keolis were the two bidders for the contract. On January 8, 2014, the MBTA awarded Keolis the contract for $2.68 billion over eight years, with the possibility of two two-year extensions that could bring the total price to $4.3 billion. Keolis took over the operations on July 1, 2014. Keolis lost $29.3 million in its first year of operation. In June 2020, the MBTA extended the contract through at least 2025. 

Free Wi-Fi internet service was piloted in January 2008 on the Worcester Line, where 45 coaches were fitted with routers which connected to cellular data networks. This was the first Wi-Fi available on a commuter rail service in the United States. The program was considered successful; in December 2008, the MBTA announced that Wi-Fi would be available on all trains by mid-2009. In July 2014, the MBTA announced that a private company would be building a new network by 2016 to replace the 2008-built network. The MBTA would not pay for the new network; the company would have a two-tier model with a fee for higher bandwidth. By that time, the 2008-built system was largely unusable to the decommissioning of 3G networks.

Positive Train Control was implemented on the entire system per a federal mandate, which required installation by the end of 2018 with the possibility of a two-year extension. Construction began in 2017. The final segment of the system to have Positive Train Control activated was the inner Worcester Line on August 15, 2020. Most of the southside lines already had cab signals for automatic train control (ATC) prior to PTC implementation, but the northside lines did not. Cab signals on the southside were completed in 2020; cab signals on the northside will be completed in 2023. Temporary bus replacements for several lines took place between 2017 and 2022 during PTC and ATC construction and testing.

The Greenbush Line opened in 2007.
The Riverside-Framingham section was sold to the MBTA in 1976 as part of their larger acquisition of PC commuter assets, but the section past Framingham remained in Conrail control. In September 2009, Conrail successor CSX Transportation and the Commonwealth finalized a  agreement to purchase CSX's Framingham to Worcester tracks, as well as the Grand Junction Railroad plus lines which will be part of the South Coast Rail project, to improve service on the Framingham/Worcester Line. After several years of construction and negotiations, ownership of the line was transferred to the commonwealth on October 4, 2012, with increased service on the outer section of the line beginning several weeks later.
As Big Dig mitigation, MBTA rebuilt existing stations and is adding 4 new stations along the line. The first of these, Talbot Avenue, opened on November 12, 2012, followed by Newmarket and Four Corners/Geneva on July 1, 2013. Blue Hill Avenue station was opened on February 25, 2019, after many delays.
Service was extended further south to  T. F. Green Airport in Warwick, Rhode Island in December 2010 and to Wickford Junction in North Kingston in April 2012. This represents the first commuter service in Rhode Island south of Providence since 1981.
In 2013, the CapeFLYER service began running from South Station to Hyannis on summer weekends – the first direct service from Boston to Cape Cod since 1959. Though officially a Cape Cod Regional Transit Authority service, the CapeFLYER uses MBTA equipment. 
A 4-mile extension of the Fitchburg Line to Wachusett station opened on September 30, 2016.

COVID-19 pandemic 
Weekday service was substantially cut on March 17, 2020, due to reduced ridership during the COVID-19 pandemic. On June 22, service was increased to 85% of normal weekday levels. Changes effective November 2 reduced peak service and increased off-peak service, providing more consistent midday headways on some lines; Foxboro pilot service was suspended.

In November 2020, as part of service cuts during the pandemic, the MBTA proposed to close six low-ridership stations. On December 14, the MBTA Board voted to enact a more limited set of cuts, including indefinitely closing five stations. That day, temporary reduced schedules were again put into place, with four of the five stations (and ) not served.

On January 23, 2021, reduced schedules based on the December 14 vote went into place, with no weekend service on seven lines. Service changes on April 5, 2021, increased midday service on most lines as part of a transition to a regional rail model. Weekend service on the seven lines resumed on July 3, 2021. Ridership dropped substantially during the COVID-19 pandemic, with daily boardings just 12,800 during the first quarter of 2021. Ridership rose to 47,100 average weekday boardings in the first quarter of 2022, and 85,000 (69% of 2018 ridership) in October 2022.

Rolling stock 

All MBTA commuter rail service is provided by push-pull trains powered by diesel locomotives with a cab car on the opposite end. The locomotive is usually on the end facing away from Boston so that diesel exhaust does not enter the passenger concourses at North Station and South Station. Trains typically have four to eight coaches (with six the most common) and seat between 400 and 1,400 passengers. Approximately 65 trainsets are needed for weekday service.

The primary heavy maintenance facility is the MBTA Commuter Rail Maintenance Facility, located in the Inner Belt District in Somerville. It is also used for midday and overnight storage of trains on the northside lines. Southampton Street Yard and the Readville Interim Layover facility are used for light maintenance and layover service. Various other layover facilities are used for midday and overnight storage; most are located near the outer ends of the lines. Some maintenance and storage of MBTA equipment is contracted out to the Seaview Transportation Company in North Kingstown, Rhode Island.

Several additional yards are under construction or planned. A new midday layover yard at the former Beacon Park Yard is planned to be constructed by 2032 as part of the realignment of I-90. A large midday and overnight layover yard, which would support expanded service including regional rail and electrification, is planned at Widett Circle near South Station.

Locomotive fleet 
, the MBTA owned 110 locomotives. Of these, 89 were in active passenger service and two used for work service. Twelve were undergoing rebuild, three awaiting repairs, and four retired and awaiting disposition. All passenger locomotives are equipped with head end power. Rebuilding of 37 F40PHM-2C and F40PHM-2C locomotives to F40PH-3C class by MotivePower (MPI) began in 2017; other older locomotives are also being rebuilt by MPI or in-house.

Coach fleet 
, the MBTA owned 475 coaches. Of these, 399 were in active service, nine being repaired or overhauled, 16 leased to the Connecticut Department of Transportation (ConnDOT) for use on the Hartford Line, and 51 pending disposition or reuse. Coaches whose designations start with BTC (Blind Trailer Coach) are conventional coaches, while those starting with CTC (Control Trailer Coach) are cab cars. Coaches acquired before 1990 were single-level cars with 88 to 127 seats; those since are bilevel cars with 173 to 185 seats. Some coaches are equipped with electronic doors for use on the Old Colony Lines and Greenbush Line, which have full-length high-level platforms at all stops. All BTC-3, CTC-3, BTC-4C, and BTC-4D coaches have restrooms. During winter months, a Ski Train serving Wachusett Mountain runs on the Fitchburg Line, using a coach car which is equipped for carrying bicycles or skis. Three converted coaches – a bike car and two cafe cars – are reserved for the CapeFLYER.

The agency issued a $279 million contract (total project cost of $345 million) for 80 additional Rotem bilevel coaches in September 2019, with delivery expected from September 2022 to June 2024. The contract was later modified to 83 coaches, of which 43 are cab cars. The first four of the 83 bilevel cars arrived in June 2022; they are expected to enter service in late 2022. An additional procurement of 100 bilevel cars, to be delivered from 2024 to 2027, was postponed due to the COVID-19 pandemic.

Retired equipment 

As the MBTA assumed control of the commuter rail during the 1970s, it inherited various equipment from predecessor railroads. The 1976 purchase of B&M and Penn Central equipment included 94 Budd Rail Diesel Cars (RDCs) – 86 from the B&M and eight from Penn Central – plus 116 Penn Central coaches and 25 Penn Central E8 and GP9 diesel locomotives. Although the MBTA purchased some new equipment in 1978–1980, large locomotive and coach fleets were not purchased until the late 1980s, so the first decade of combined operations used a variety of secondhand equipment in addition to that acquired in 1976:
Four ALCO PA locomotives leased from the Delaware and Hudson Railway in 1978
48 coaches leased from GO Transit in 1978–1980. 51 coaches (some of which were in the previous group) were leased in 1984–85.
19 EMD GP7 locomotives leased from the B&M in 1978–1982
24 RDCs acquired or leased from MARC, SEPTA, and New Jersey Transit between 1983 and 1987
11 EMD GP9 locomotives acquired from the Burlington Northern Railroad and SEMTA in 1983–1986
One EMD SW9 locomotive acquired from the Seaboard Coast Line Railroad in 1984
Most of the secondhand and inherited equipment was retired between 1979 and 1989. 33 ex-B&M RDCs were converted to locomotive-hauled coaches (designated BTC-2 and CTC-2) in 1980 and 1982; they were retired by 1989. This left all MBTA service operated by locomotives and coaches purchased new by the MBTA. At several points since, the MBTA or its contract operator has temporarily leased locomotives when needed. Some passenger equipment acquired new by the MBTA has been retired:
18 EMD F40PH locomotives (1000–1017), built 1978–1980 and last ran in 2015
19 EMD FP10 locomotives (1100–1114 and 1150–1153), rebuilt 1979 from Gulf, Mobile and Ohio Railroad locomotives and last ran in 1991

Expansion projects

Regional rail and electrification 

The MBTA plans to convert the system from diesel-powered commuter rail – which is primarily designed for Boston-centric trips at peak hours – to an electric regional rail system with frequent all-day service. Initial steps were taken in fall 2020 when some peak service was moved to midday, and in April 2021 when 9 of the 15 lines were moved to clock-face scheduling. A previous attempt at regional rail was made in 2013–2014 with a procurement for diesel multiple units for the Fairmount Line, new Track 61 service, and several other lines with the new service being labeled as the Indigo Line.  The DMU procurement as well as the Indigo Line proposal was canceled in 2015.

In 2021, the MBTA indicated plans to pilot electric multiple units on Providence service (on the Northeast Corridor, which is already electrified for Amtrak service) in 2024, with the Fairmount Line and the inner section of the Newburyport/Rockport Line electrified later in the decade. Several preliminary projects, including planning for a new layover facility, are scheduled for fiscal years 2023 to 2027 – but not actual electrification. By 2022, lawmakers and environmental advocacy groups had criticized recent MBTA proposals for not adhering to previously set rail initiatives. 

In June 2022, the MBTA indicated plans to purchase battery electric multiple units, with catenary for charging on part of the network. This is intended to reduce the amount of catenary installation required, avoid reconstructions of overhead bridges, and avoid poor existing power grids on some branch lines. Plans call for electric service on the Providence/Stoughton Line and Fairmount line by 2028–29, followed by the Newburyport/Rockport Line in 2031; all lines would be electrified by 2050. Pilot electric service between Boston and Providence would be possible after the late 2023 introduction of the Avelia Liberty freed up ACS-64 locomotives for use. Funding for electrification of the Framingham/Worcester Line was included in a 2022 state bond bill. Transit advocates have expressed concern that a hybrid service plan remains unproven for regional rail applications and could be more expensive to operate than full-build electrification; others have criticized that the MBTA's cost and construction projections for system-wide catenary installation were overestimated in comparison to similar project costs in Europe and North America.

North–South Rail Link 
No direct connection exists between the two downtown commuter rail terminals; passengers must use the MBTA subway or other modes to transfer between the two halves of the system. (For non-revenue transfers of equipment, the MBTA and Amtrak use the Grand Junction Branch.) The proposed North–South Rail Link would add a new rail tunnel under downtown Boston to allow through-running service, with new underground stations at South Station, North Station, and possibly a new Central Station. A feasibility study was conducted in 2018.

South Coast Rail 

The South Coast Rail project is under construction to extend service to the South Coast cities of Taunton, Fall River, and New Bedford, which were last served by commuter service in 1958. A full planning process was held from 1990 until its suspension in 2002. Planning restarted in 2007, with environmental documentation completed in August 2013. Plans were modified into two phases in 2017 due to an increase in costs. Phase I is under construction to run diesel service beginning in 2023 as an extension of the Middleborough/Lakeville Line via the Middleboro Secondary. Phase II, planned for 2030, would extend the Stoughton Branch of the Providence/Stoughton Line over a reactivated line with electric service.

Other extensions 
Two extensions of existing lines have been studied in the 2020s:
Extension of the Middleborough/Lakeville Line to Buzzards Bay or Sagamore (both in Bourne) to serve Cape Cod was studied in 1997, and extension to Buzzards Bay was again studied in 2007. The extension was again proposed after the 2013 introduction of the CapeFLYER. The town of Bourne voted in 2015 to join the MBTA district. MassDOT began planning a possible commuter rail trial service in October 2015. The proposed service, which was to have shuttle trains between Bourne and  operated by Massachusetts Coastal Railroad, was rejected by the MBTA Fiscal Management and Control Board in April 2016. Middleborough station, which will replace Middleborough/Lakeville in 2023 when South Coast Rail service begins, was built with space for a potential future platform for shuttle trains. A 2021 study analyzed two alternatives for service to Buzzards Bay or Bourne station. Middleborough–Buzzards Bay shuttle service with 7 daily round trips was expected to have 1,710 total daily boardings, while Middleborough–Bourne service with 10 daily round trips (including two off-peak Boston–Bourne round trips) was expected to have 2,540 total daily boardings.
Extension of the Lowell Line to Manchester and Nashua, New Hampshire has been proposed since the 1980–81 pilot service. The extension has been a politically contentious issue at the state level in New Hampshire, with Democratic politicians supporting the service and Republican politicians opposing it. A 2014 alternatives analysis recommended several possible services, including commuter rail to Nashua or Manchester or intercity rail to Concord, for further evaluation. Engineering and design work for commuter service to Manchester began in late 2020, and was completed in February 2023.

Several other extensions of existing lines and restoration of service to disused lines have been studied in the past:

Extension of the Providence/Stoughton Line to Westerly, Rhode Island (studied in 2001 and 2017)
Extension of the Franklin Line to Milford (studied in 1997) or Woonsocket, Rhode Island (studied in 2007)
Restoration of service on the Milford Branch to Milford (studied in 1990 and 1997)
Restoration of service on the Fitchburg Secondary to Marlborough (studied in 1990) or Northborough/I-290 (studied in 2002)
Rerouting of some Framingham/Worcester Line service to North Station via the Grand Junction Branch (studied in 2012)
Restoration of service on the Central Mass Branch to Berlin/I-495 (studied in 1996)
Extension of the Haverhill Line to Plaistow, New Hampshire (studied in 2015)
Extension of the Newburyport/Rockport Line to Portsmouth, New Hampshire (studied in 1988 and 1999)

Infill stations 

Several infill stations on existing lines are under construction or proposed:
West Station is a proposed Framingham/Worcester Line station to serve the Beacon Park Yard redevelopment.
South Salem station is a proposed Newburyport/Rockport Line station near Salem State University.

Station renovations 
Several station renovations for accessibility, expanded service, and/or repairs are under construction or planned:
Natick Center station is being rebuilt for accessibility, with completion expected in fall 2024.
Winchester Center station is being rebuilt for accessibility, with completion expected in April 2024. The station was temporarily closed in January 2021 due to structural deterioration.
A second platform at Worcester Union Station is under construction, with completion expected in February 2024.
Design work for reconstruction of South Attleboro station for accessibility was completed in April 2022, though construction work has not been funded. The station was temporarily closed in February 2021 due to structural deterioration.
The station was temporarily closed in October 2022 due to structural deterioration.

See also 
List of Massachusetts railroads
East-West Passenger Rail

References

External links 

MBTA – Commuter Rail Schedules and Maps
Keolis Commuter Services
NETransit – MBTA Fleet Roster
MBTA Rail Vision – future transformation plans

 
Keolis
Passenger rail transportation in Massachusetts
Passenger rail transportation in Rhode Island
Massachusetts railroads
Rhode Island railroads
Transportation in New England
Commuter rail in the United States
Standard gauge railways in the United States